Leiocithara perlucidula is a species of sea snail, a marine gastropod mollusk in the family Mangeliidae.

Description
The length of the shell attains 5 mm, its diameter 2.3 mm.

Distribution
This species occurs off Northern Zululand to Eastern Cape Province, South Africa, at depths between 40 m and 150 m.

References

 Kilburn R.N. 1992. Turridae (Mollusca: Gastropoda) of southern Africa and Mozambique. Part 6. Subfamily Mangeliinae, section 1. Annals of the Natal Museum, 33: 461–575

External links
  Tucker, J.K. 2004 Catalog of recent and fossil turrids (Mollusca: Gastropoda). Zootaxa 682:1–1295.

Endemic fauna of South Africa
perlucidula
Gastropods described in 1992